Leonard Turner (13 October 1859 Ipswich – 21 August 1944, Ipswich) was a prominent engineer in Ipswich, Suffolk. He was the founding president of the Ipswich Engineering Society in 1899. He also was active as a watercolour painter exhibiting with the Ipswich Fine Art Club.

References

1859 births
1944 deaths
People from Ipswich